San Pedro Salvatierra Airport  is an airstrip serving San Pedro Salvatierra in the Beni Department of Bolivia.

See also

Transport in Bolivia
List of airports in Bolivia

References

External links 
OpenStreetMap - San Pedro
OurAirports - San Pedro
Fallingrain - San Pedro Airport
Bing Maps - San Pedro

Airports in Beni Department